Porthcothan is a coastal village between Newquay and Padstow in Cornwall, England, UK. It is within the civil parish of St Eval.

Porthcothan lies within the Cornwall Area of Outstanding Natural Beauty (AONB). Almost a third of Cornwall has AONB designation, with the same status and protection as a National Park.

The sandy beach is popular with tourists and surfers and is patrolled by lifeguards during the day in the summer; local surf schools sometimes use the beach for tuition. There is a pay-and-display car park and a small grocery shop near the beach. In January 2014, storm Anne reduced a local arch, Jan Leverton's Rock, to rubble.

History
As with many coves in Cornwall Porthcothan has legends of smuggling, and there is a large cave some mile inland that is reputed to have been used to store the smuggled goods.

Notable residents
Notable former residents include the early science fiction author J. D. Beresford and the playwright Nick Darke. The novelist D. H. Lawrence lived locally at one time, but did not get on with the local populace who accused him of spying during World War I.

See also

Other coastal villages and bays nearby
 Harlyn
 Constantine Bay
 Trevone
 Treyarnon
 Carnewas & Bedruthan Steps

Other villages nearby
 St Merryn

References

External links

Villages in Cornwall
Beaches of Cornwall
Bays of Cornwall